Gwilym Iwan Jones (3 May 1904 – 25 January 1995) was a Welsh photographer and anthropologist.  His photographs of life in Nigeria in the 1930s, taken whilst serving as a colonial District Officer, led to an interest in ethnology and a second career as an academic at the University of Cambridge.

Life
Jones was born in Cape Colony and grew up in Chile and England, studying at St. John's School, Leatherhead before winning a scholarship to Jesus College, Oxford.  He then worked for the Colonial Service in Nigeria (1926–1946), serving as District Officer for Bende and the surrounding area.  He became interested in the culture of the peoples of southeastern Nigeria, using a Rolleiflex camera to build up an extensive record of life in the area at the time. Amongst other topics, his photographs show masks being used in performance, and shrines. He married Ursula Whittall in 1939 and his interest in ethnology led him to return to England as Lecturer in Anthropology at the University of Cambridge, a post he held in conjunction with a Fellowship of Jesus College, Cambridge.  He was a noted scholar on African issues, returning on various occasions to Nigeria for research.  He retired in 1971, but continued to write and remained active within Jesus College.

Publications
The Ibo and Ibibio Speaking Peoples of S.E. Nigeria (with Daryll Forde) (1950) 
The Trading States of the Oil Rivers (1963) 
The Art of Southeastern Nigeria (1984)
Annual Reports of Bende Division, South Eastern Nigeria, 1905–1912 (1986)
Ibo Art (1989)
From Slaves to Palm Oil (1989)

External links
The G. I. Jones photographic archive of Southeastern Nigerian art and culture

References

1904 births
1995 deaths
People educated at St John's School, Leatherhead
Alumni of Jesus College, Oxford
Welsh photographers
Welsh anthropologists
Fellows of Jesus College, Cambridge
People from colonial Nigeria
British expatriates in Cape Colony
British expatriates in Chile
British expatriates in Nigeria
20th-century Welsh scientists